Nokia Arena (originally Tampere Deck Arena) is an indoor arena in Tampere, Finland. It hosts ice hockey games, including the 2022 Men's World Championship, and large cultural events. It is also the home arena of Ilves and Tappara of the SM-liiga. Its construction was approved by the City Council of Tampere on 19 May 2010. The arena was officially opened on 3 December 2021.

The NHL teams Columbus Blue Jackets and Colorado Avalanche played two games at Nokia Arena in the 2022 NHL Global Series on 4–5 November 2022.

Nokia Arena is hosting back to back World Championships, as Tampere is hosting 2023 IIHF World Championship with Riga, Latvia,

Background

After delays, the arena and the adjacent mixed use high-rise development got a final approval and construction began in January 2018. The final plan calls for a deck to be built over a railway line. This deck will have the multi-purpose arena (at least 13,455 seats), offices, commercial development, housing, a hotel and a casino. The overall vision was designed by Daniel Libeskind. The arena is expected to be complete by December 2021, in time for the 2022 IIHF World Championship. The rest of the development is to be completed by 2024. Casino Tampere will also open in connection with the arena, and according to preliminary plans, the casino will employ about 80 people.  opened a luxury hotel called Lapland Hotels Arena next to the arena on 12 December 2021.

In March 2020, it was announced that, under a ten-year sponsorship agreement with the UROS Group in Oulu, the arena will be called UROS LIVE. The naming caused a small scale scandal due to name's overly masculine tone, as uros means "male" in Finnish. The agreement was terminated on 28 October 2021 due to Uros Oy's financial problems, and the name of the arena was changed as a result. Nokia Corporation was chosen as the new sponsor on 19 November 2021, and the arena was renamed as Nokia Arena.

The first scheduled events in the arena were the local matches of the Finnish Championship League on 3 and 4 December 2021. It was originally scheduled to open on 15 December, but later the official opening was brought forward to 3 December.

Concerts

Transport
Nokia Arena is easily accessible by public transport, being located 600 meters from the Tampere central railway station and 350 meters from the long-distance bus station. The nearest stops on the Tampere tramway are also approximately 600 and 350 meters away, for lines 3 and 1 respectively. Several local bus routes run on the nearby streets. During the 2022–23 Liiga and CHL seasons, hockey game tickets are also valid tickets for the buses, trams and trains of Nysse, the regional transport authority.

For private cars, there are few parking spaces at the arena but several parking facilities are available nearby. Before and after major events, the streets around the arena may be closed to vehicular traffic.

See also

 List of indoor arenas in Nordic countries
 List of Finnish ice hockey arenas
 Tampere Ice Stadium

References

External links

  
 Nokia Arena at Visit Tampere 

Indoor arenas in Finland
Buildings and structures in Tampere
Nokia
Sport in Tampere
Sports venues completed in 2021
2021 establishments in Finland